Badrabad (also Romanized as Badrābād) is a village in Dashtab Rural District, in the Central District of Baft County, Kerman Province, Iran. At the 2006 census, its population was 100, in 22 families.

References 

Populated places in Baft County